Lannion is a commune in the Côtes-d'Armor department in Brittany in northwestern France. It is a subprefecture of Côtes-d'Armor, the capital of Trégor and the center of an urban area of almost 60,000 inhabitants.

Climate 
Lannion has a oceanic climate (Köppen climate classification Cfb).

Population

Inhabitants of Lannion are called lannionnais in French.

History
Lannion takes its name from "Lann Huon" in Breton or "Parish of Huon" in English.

The old neighborhood of Lannion attracts many tourists to the city. The old neighborhood contains old squares, a church called Brélévenez, half-timbered houses, chapels and frescoes.

Breton language
On 23 October 2006, the municipality launched a plan to promote the Breton language through the Ya d'ar brezhoneg ("Yes to Breton") charter.

In 2008, 11.96% of the children attended bilingual schools in primary education.

Economy
Lannion is a large telecommunications research center in France with several firms such as Nokia, Orange and SAGEMCOM operating there. The presence of a large telecommunications industry in the area has led to two institutes of technology in the area, IUT Lannion and a college of engineering, ENSSAT.

Culture
Regular concerts known as "Les Tardives" are held in the town square during the summer months. Lannion is also home to the "Carré Magique", a well known theatre company in the area.

Transport
Lannion is served by extensive transport links. The nearby Lannion – Côte de Granit Airport was recently expanded to accommodate larger flights arriving from Paris and other French destinations. It is a one-hour flight from Lannion to Paris. Lannion station provides TGV services to Brest, St. Brieuc, Rennes and Paris as well as TER links to local stations.

There is a bus service connecting the town centre to surrounding areas, TILT (Transports Intercommunaux de Lannion-Trégor), with six lines. 
Line A  Hospital/Airport via Quai d'Aiguillon (in the centre of the town)
Line B  Kerbabu/Coppens via Quai d'Aiguillon
Line C  Alcatel/Kérilis
Line Navéo  small bus around the centre of the town
Line F  market day line (Thursday morning).

International relations
Lannion is twinned with:
  Günzburg, Germany
  Viveiro, Galicia (Spain)
  Caerphilly, Wales

Notable people
The following were born in Lannion:
 François-Jean-Marie Laouënan (1868), Archbishop
 Pierre-Yves André (1974), footballer
 Jean-Efflam Bavouzet (1962), pianist
 Charles Le Goffic (1863), novelist and historian
 Johan Le Bon (1990), cyclist
 Christophe Le Mével (1980), cyclist
 Denis-Will Poha (1997), footballer
 Pierre Sabbagh (1918), television personality

See also
Communes of the Côtes-d'Armor department

References

External links

Official website 

Communes of Côtes-d'Armor
Subprefectures in France